A Beautiful Soul is a 2012 drama film directed by American director Jeffrey W. Byrd. The film was released May 4, 2012 and stars Deitrick Haddon, Lesley-Ann Brandt, and Harry Lennix.

Plot
R&B superstar Andre Stephens (Deitrick Haddon) is on top of the world.  He has success, fame, and fortune but spiritually he has lost his way.  However, his "perfect" life is shattered when his entourage is brutally attacked, leaving Andre and his best friend Chris Johnson (Robert Ri'chard) clinging to life.  On a spiritual journey that exists in a place that is neither on Earth nor in Heaven, Andre is given the opportunity to reevaluate his life and his faith. Andre realises he has a long way to go at church before being great.

Cast
 Deitrick Haddon as Andre Stephens
 Skylan Brooks as Young Andre Stephens
 Robert Ri'chard as Chris Scott
 Lesley-Ann Brandt as Angela Berry
 Harry Lennix as Jeff Freeze
 Barry Floyd as Terrance Wilson
 Trevor Jackson as Quincy Smith
 Monica Ramon

Reception
Variety gave a mostly negative review for A Beautiful Soul, remarking that the "slackness of the storytelling has the effect of subjecting the low-budget pic’s supernatural elements to charm-killing scrutiny."

Awards
 2013: Black Reel Award for Outstanding Television Film or Mini-Series

See also
List of black films of the 2010s

References

External links 
 

African-American drama films
2012 drama films
2012 films
Films directed by Jeffrey W. Byrd
2010s English-language films
2010s American films